A6, A 6 or A-6 can refer to:

Arts and entertainment
A6, a mutated flu virus in the short story "Night Surf" by Stephen King
A-6, a renamed version of the US Security Group in the 1997 comic book movie Spawn

Electronics and software
A6 record, a type of DNS record
Apple A6, a System-on-a-chip ARM processor
Hanlin eReader A6, an ebook reader
Samsung Galaxy A6, a smartphone by Samsung

Military
A6, the designation for air force headquarters staff concerned with signals, communications, or information technology
In the United Kingdom, the A6 Air CIS (Computers & Information Systems) branch, also known as JFACHQ, UK Joint Force Air Component Headquarters
A 6, a Swedish artillery regiment
Grumman A-6 Intruder, a twin-engine, mid-wing all-weather US Navy medium attack aircraft manufactured by Grumman, in service from 1962 to 1997

Science and technology

Biology
British NVC community A6 (Ceratophyllum submersum community), a British Isles plants community
Noradrenergic cell group A6
Subfamily A6, a subfamily of Rhodopsin-like receptors
Xenopus A6 kidney epithelial cells in cell culture

Transportation

Civil aviation transport
A6, the IATA code for Air Alps Aviation
United Arab Emirates aircraft registration code

Civilian aircraft
Focke-Wulf A6, a 1930s civilian aircraft from the German Focke-Wulf company

Automobiles
Arrows A6, a British racing car
Audi A6, a German executive car
Changhe A6, a Chinese compact sedan
JAC Refine A6, a Chinese mid-size sedan concept
Maserati A6, an Italian sports coupe series

Roads and routes
A6 road, in several countries
Route A6 (WMATA), a bus route operated by the Washington Metropolitan Area Transit Authority\

Watercraft
A-6, formerly , a Plunger-class submarine of the United States Navy
 , a British A-class submarine of the Royal Navy

Other
Prussian A 6, a 1913 German railbus
A6, an aggregate series (A1 to A12) German rocket design in World War II, never implemented
LNER Class A6, a class of 4-6-2T locomotives

Other uses
A6 (classification), an amputee sport classification
A-6 tool steel, an air-hardening SAE grade of tool steel
A6, an ISO 216 international standard paper size (105×148 mm)
A6, or A (musical note) above soprano C, the highest note written or acknowledged as musical in classical music
ASICS, a footwear company whose name and logo resemble A6

A06
A.06, a track title on Linkin Park Underground Linkin Park fan club compilation
A06 (band), a Massachusetts-based rock band associated with multi-instrumentalist Casey Crescenzo
ATC code A06 Laxatives, a subgroup of the Anatomical Therapeutic Chemical Classification System
HMNZS Monowai (A06), a 1975 Royal New Zealand Navy hydrographic survey vessel
Réti Opening code in the Encyclopaedia of Chess Openings